Francis Scott (31 January 1806, Mertoun, Berwickshire – 9 March 1884, Send Hurst near Guildford) was a British politician.

Scott was the youngest son of Hugh Scott, 6th Lord Polwarth. Educated at Trinity College, Cambridge, he read for the bar at the Middle Temple. In 1835 he married the daughter of the Rev. Charles Boultbee. He was MP for Roxburghshire from 1841 to 1847, and for Berwickshire from 1847 to 1859. Between 1844 and 1851, Scott acted as the Parliamentary Agent for the New South Wales, representing the interests of the New South Wales Legislative Council in the House of Commons.
From 1866 to 1876 he was master of the Surrey Union hounds, and actively promoted the Hunt Servants' Benefit Society.

References

External links

1806 births
1884 deaths
Members of the Parliament of the United Kingdom for Scottish constituencies
UK MPs 1841–1847
UK MPs 1847–1852
UK MPs 1852–1857
UK MPs 1857–1859
Alumni of Trinity College, Cambridge
Members of the Middle Temple
Unionist Party (Scotland) MPs
People from Berwickshire